John Grogan (born 1957) is an American journalist and non-fiction writer.

John Grogan may also refer to:

 John Grogan (politician) (born 1961), former Labour Member of Parliament for Keighley
 John Grogan (hurler) (born 1956), Irish retired hurler
 John S. Grogan (1880–1952), American football, basketball, and baseball player and coach

See also
 Grogan (surname)